61 Hours is the fourteenth book in the Jack Reacher thriller series written by Lee Child. It was published on 18 March 2010 both in the United Kingdom and in the USA. It is written in the third person. In the story, former military police officer Jack Reacher agrees to help the police in a small South Dakota town protect an elderly witness to a biker gang methamphetamine deal. As Reacher and the police investigate the gang's compound, the threats to the witness escalate to murder and the involvement of a powerful drug kingpin.

Plot summary
Jack Reacher is hitching a ride on a senior citizen's tour through South Dakota in the middle of winter when the bus skids out on the interstate, disabling it. Together with the bus driver and the local deputy chief of police, Peterson, Reacher helps the elderly tourists get to safety in the nearby town of Bolton.

Bolton is home to one of the largest prisons in the United States. Reacher learns that in the event of an escape or riot in the prison, the entire Bolton Police Department is legally required to abandon whatever they were doing and report there. This is problematic because Bolton is also home to a gang of methamphetamine dealers operating out of a mysterious abandoned U.S. military facility nearby. The local police cannot get probable cause to search the complex without the testimony of a retired librarian, Janet Salter, the only person willing to testify that she saw a drug deal take place in Bolton. Peterson and the chief of police, Holland, know that if the prison siren rings, the officers guarding Salter will have to leave, making her easy prey for the drug dealers.

Reacher agrees to help the Bolton police, first by determining what was stored in the abandoned military compound. He calls up his old military police unit in Virginia, and is connected with its newest commanding officer, Major Susan Turner. Reacher and Turner are mutually attracted to each other over the phone, and Turner agrees to help Reacher if he will tell her the story of how the desk in her office, which used to be Reacher's, ended up with a head-size dent in it. Reacher asks whether Turner is married, and she hangs up the phone.

Reacher travels to the military compound and finds no evidence of a methamphetamine lab, only a small stone building surrounded by barracks huts whose residents are about to move out. He determines that the long road leading up to the compound is actually a runway, and deduces that it must have been an U.S. Air Force facility. Turner finds out that forty tons of surplus materiel from World War II are being stored in tunnels accessed under the small stone building, but cannot figure out the exact contents. She also finds out that the facility, constructed in the 1950s, was intended to be an orphanage and fallout shelter for kids whose parents were killed in a nuclear war. Based on the complex's pristine condition, Reacher guesses that its owner, a midget Latin American drug lord named Plato, is getting ready to sell it, but cannot do it while Salter is still alive.

A local lawyer who relayed instructions in and out of the Bolton prison is found shot dead in his car, telling Reacher and the police that Plato's hitman has arrived in town. Reacher stays with Salter to guard her, and teaches her how to fire a gun. Holland, Peterson, and Reacher find the key to the tunnel head and venture underground. In a maze of tunnels that are only four feet high, because they were intended for children, Reacher finds tons of methamphetamine in boxes dating to the 1940s. He deduces that it must have been surplus from doses given to World War II bomber pilots.

On his way home from the police station, Peterson is shot dead by the unknown killer, who Reacher now believes to be a police officer. Holland orders the entire department to return to the station, but tells Reacher that he cannot bear to tell the news to Peterson's widow. While Reacher is at Peterson's house, the prison siren goes off. Reacher, lacking a vehicle, desperately runs through the deep snow to protect Salter. He is too late, and finds her shot to death in her library, her gun in her pocket.

Reacher calls Turner and says he is contemplating suicide. He tells Turner that the dent in the desk came from when he nearly killed a one-star general who had stolen food supplies meant for Reacher and other troops stationed in Kuwait during the 1991 Gulf War to buy a Chevrolet Corvette. The incident cost Reacher his command and his career in the army. Turner tells Reacher to ask her if she is married. He asks, and she says "No." He promises to head towards Virginia the next day.

Plato and a crew of henchmen fly to the abandoned airfield on a private airliner, intending to pack it full of methamphetamine before selling the base to a Russian gangster. Reacher and Holland drive out to the base, and Reacher reveals that he knows Holland is the killer working for Plato. Holland crashes his police car, but Reacher survives and kills Holland. Plato arrives, and Reacher pretends that he is Holland and goes underground with the gangster. Reacher attacks Plato, but his massive frame is at a severe disadvantage in the cramped space.

Unbeknownst to Plato, two of his men are actually working for the Russian. They kill Plato's other henchmen, and begin pumping jet fuel from Plato's aircraft into the fallout bunker. Reacher manages to kill Plato, and desperately runs up the stairs as the henchmen drop a flare down the shaft.

In Virginia, Turner watches news reports of a massive explosion at an Air Force facility outside Bolton, South Dakota, giving off fumes containing some kind of stimulant. A month later, she is redeployed to Afghanistan without a call from Reacher.

Critical reception
—Janet Maslin, The New York Times

References

External links
 61 Hours information page on Lee Child's official website.

2010 British novels
English thriller novels
Jack Reacher books
Novels set in South Dakota
Third-person narrative novels
Bantam Press books